The .308×1.5" Barnes is a wildcat cartridge based on the .308 Winchester (7.62×51mm NATO). The cartridge is similar to the 7.62×39mm Russian (M43) cartridge though it outperforms the Soviet cartridge.

History
The first rifles commissioned for the developmental work by Barnes for the .308×1.5" cartridge were a Swedish Model 96 Mauser with a 1 in 12 (305 mm) twist built by Les Corbet and a Remington Rolling Block with a 1 in 10 (254 mm) twist built by P.O. Ackley. Due to the weights of the bullet and the performance of the cartridge, the 1 in 12 twist became the standard by consensus.

Similar cartridges
Apart from experimenting with .308×1.75", the legacy of the Barnes cartridge is found in its progeny cartridges. The .308×1.5" caused a wildcatting craze, which had individuals necking the cartridge down to .224 (5.56 mm), .243 (6 mm), .264 (6.5 mm), .284 (7 mm) and necking up to .338 (8.5 mm) and .375 (9.5 mm). Due to the cartridges’ efficiency and accuracy, many of these cartridges, such as the .22 BR, 6mm BR, 6mm BR Norma, 7mm BR, and .30 BR, went on to become popular benchrest cartridges and some of these were adopted by mainstream ammunition manufacturers. The .308×1.5" was one of the original short fat cartridge designs, having a length to width ratio of 3.17. The short fat cartridge design is considered to promote efficiency and shot to shot consistency.

The .308×1.5" Barnes cartridge is comparable to cartridges such as the 7.62×39mm and the .30-30 Winchester. While the Barnes and 7.62×39 are similar length, the Barnes has a greater body girth, which provides a greater propellant capacity which in turn contributes to its performance advantage. For this reason, most factory .30-30 ammunition loaded with a  bullet achieves a mere . Furthermore, the Barnes cartridge is capable of launching heavier bullets than the 7.62×39 and has the advantage of using spitzer bullets and is chambered in strong bolt-action rifles, whereas the .30-30 is commonly loaded with round-nose or flat-nose bullets due to the fact that it is chambered in lever-action rifles with tubular magazines.

The .308×1.5" Barnes was intended as a short range deer cartridge that could also be used as a varmint and predator cartridge. For predator and varmint hunting, bullets weighing  are commonly used.

References

Further reading

External links

Pistol and rifle cartridges
Wildcat cartridges